Samuel Adjei (born 18 January 1992) is a Swedish footballer of Ghanaian descent.

Career
Adjei was born in Eksjö, Sweden. He was discovered as a 12-year-old by lower league Swedish club Waggeryds IK. In January 2009, Premier League side Newcastle United signed Adjei from Swedish Second Division club Jönköpings Södra IF for a significant fee. He then quickly made an impression in his new surroundings by playing in a first team friendly against Huddersfield Town in August 2009. At Newcastle United, Adjei spent three years developing, but soon suffered a nightmare time with injury and failing to progress during the periods when he has been fit.

On 2 March 2012, Adjei joined Football League One side Hartlepool United on month-long loan deal. He made his debut for Pool on 3 March, in a 1–1 draw with Milton Keynes Dons, coming on as a substitute for James Poole. However, playing 30 minutes on his debut, Adjei soon suffered an hamstring injury, which leave him out for three-four weeks and also made a return to his parent club. At the end of the season, Adjei was released by the club when his contract has expired

After seven months without a club, Adjei returned to Swedish by joining Jönköpings Södra IF, the team he started his football career, on a two-year contract. After the move, Adjei says returning to the club made him a better player and insists he made a right decision to join Newcastle United in the press conference.

References

External links

 

1992 births
Living people
Swedish men's footballers
Swedish expatriate footballers
Swedish expatriate sportspeople in England
Swedish people of Ghanaian descent
Association football forwards
Newcastle United F.C. players
Hartlepool United F.C. players
Expatriate footballers in England
English Football League players